LLI or Lli may refer to:

 Lli (trigraph) : A trigraph used in French.
 Low latent inhibition (LLI), a medical condition related to Latent inhibition which is concerned with the different observations that a stimulus adapts to.
 Levelled Literacy Interventions, teaching resources published by Heinemann, sequenced according to the Fountas and Pinnell reading levels
 Lucena Lines, Inc., a subsidiary of Jac Liner, Inc. and a bus company in the Philippines.
 Universal Wrestling Association, also known as Lucha Libre Internacional
 Unequal leg length or leg length inequality